Zion's Co-operative Mercantile Institution (typically referred to as ZCMI) was an American department store chain. It was founded in Salt Lake City, Utah, on October 9, 1868 by Brigham Young. For many years it used the slogan, "America's First Department Store."

History
Even though the Church of Jesus Christ of Latter-day Saints (LDS Church) had been headquartered in the Salt Lake City for some twenty years by that time, they were despised by the surrounding community, as Young had disparaged non-Mormon merchants who had engaged in price gouging on necessities, and encouraged boycotting these businesses in 1866. Mormon business owners were routinely charged higher prices by wholesalers who discovered they were dealing with Mormons.

Partly because of the impending completion of the railroad, and partly to create a more fair business atmosphere, it was Young's idea to encourage Mormon businesses to band together under one roof. By pooling their resources, they were able to make larger orders to sell materials and goods exclusively (at the time) to fellow LDS Church members. 

ZCMI was formally organized in 1868 and incorporated for a 25-year renewable contract in 1870. The central component of this was the LDS Church's purchase of the Eagle Emporium, a conglomerate of mercantile companies owned by William Jennings.

ZCMI became a formidable business force, eventually manufacturing its own line of boots and shoes, and a line of work clothes. It also sold everything from housing needs, lumber, nails, and the like, to household needs such as fabric, needles, thread, food preservation products, furniture, and draperies, even some beauty products; nearly everything the pioneers needed to survive and thrive.

Based in Salt Lake City, it quickly became a household name in the community. The LDS Church was a significant influence in the company, retaining a majority interest in ZCMI until its eventual sale in December 1999. The store was established by a vote from the Council of Fifty, an early organization in the LDS Church.

In 1990, ZCMI opened its first concept store called ZCMI II. Featuring a smaller floor plan than its usual stores, this concept sold solely men's and women's clothing and shoes, while lacking other departments such as housewares, linens, and children's clothing. The first of these opened at Tri City Mall in Mesa, Arizona in 1990.

In October 1999, as a result of losses for two consecutive years, along with mounting economic and social pressures, ZCMI was sold to May Department Stores Company of St. Louis, ZCMI operated under its original name as a part of May's Portland-based Meier & Frank division until April 2002, when the stores adopted the Meier & Frank name. In addition to the name change, the Utah stores in Logan and St. George, along with the Idaho stores in Idaho Falls and Pocatello, were sold to Dillard's in March 2001. May Co. was sold to Federated Department Stores (now Macy's, Inc.) in 2005. In September 2006, all Meier & Frank stores were converted to Macy's.

The façade of ZCMI was used in the City Creek Center, retaining the original ZCMI nameplate as a front for Macy's.

See also
 ZCMI Center Mall – former LDS Church shopping center near Temple Square, Salt Lake City
 Zion's Central Board of Trade
 Zions Securities – LDS Church property portfolio

References

Further reading

External links

Utah state history: ZCMI
 Utah Heritage Foundation details on the ZCMI building façade in downtown Salt Lake City

1868 establishments in Utah Territory
Clothing retailers of the United States
Companies based in Salt Lake City
Retail companies disestablished in 2002
Retail companies established in 1868
Defunct department stores based in Utah
Defunct organizational subdivisions of the Church of Jesus Christ of Latter-day Saints
Economic history of Utah
The Church of Jesus Christ of Latter-day Saints in Utah
2002 disestablishments in Utah
May Department Stores